Vienna School or Viennese School may refer to:

Music
 First Viennese School, 18th-century classical music composers in Vienna
 Second Viennese School, 20th-century composers in Vienna

Other
 Vienna School of Art History (19th and 20th centuries)
 Vienna School of History, 20th century historians attempting analyzing "barbarian" ethnicity
 Vienna Circle, 20th-century Viennese philosophers, whose influences are known as the Vienna School
 Vienna School of Ethnology, a 20th-century anthropological movement, now discredited
 Austrian School of economics, sometimes called the "Vienna School"
 Vienna School of Dermatology, a group of dermatologists affiliated to the University of Vienna in the second half of the 19th Century

See also 
 Vienna
 Austria
 University of Vienna